Robert Salaburu (born May 9, 1985) is a professional poker player from Texas, who is best known for his 8th place ($971,360) final table finish in the 2012 World Series of Poker. He has also cashed in several other live tournaments bringing his total live cashes to over $1,700,000.
Salaburu, known as "Treadinwater" online, took in $208,159 on PokerStars, placing well at the $320 Wednesday 1/4 million for a sizable $39,232; Sunday Second Chance for $34,689; and fourth at the Super Tuesday for $29,400. Salaburu had to cut his online play short because of Black Friday.

World Series Of Poker 
Robert Salaburu made a notable 8th place in the WSOP 2012. A significant moment for Salaburu in this event was when he managed to get the chip lead count, at a time when there were only 27 players left.
When Robert reached the final table, he was 7th in chips with 15,155,000.

Personal life 
Fascinated and passionate about poker since the age of 16, Robert managed to transform his interest in poker into a career in 2005. During his many years of playing poker he suffered some big swings, especially in cash games, which were partly due to bankroll management issues. 

Robert was born and raised in San Benito, Texas, although he considers San Antonio as his hometown. He was brought up by a single mother, who divorced his father a year after Robert was born. Robert also has a brother who is 11 years older. He says of himself, "It's fair to say I'm a mama's boy. I'm the baby. Mama's boy for sure."

References

External links
 Robert Salaburu's official website
 Robert Salaburu's Facebook page
 Robert Salaburu's Twitter page
 Robert Salaburu's Google+ page.
 Robert Salaburu's WSOP interview

1985 births
American poker players
Living people
People from San Antonio
People from San Benito, Texas